The National Medal of Science is an honor bestowed by the President of the United States to individuals in science and engineering who have made important contributions to the advancement of knowledge in the following six fields: behavioral and social sciences, biology, chemistry, engineering, mathematics and physical sciences. The Committee on the National Medal of Science under the National Science Foundation (NSF) is responsible for recommending medal candidates to the President.

Behavioral and Social Science
1964	Neal Elgar Miller
1986	Herbert A. Simon
1987	Anne Anastasi, George J. Stigler
1988	Milton Friedman
1990	Leonid Hurwicz, Patrick Suppes
1991	George A. Miller
1992	Eleanor J. Gibson
1994	Robert K. Merton
1995	Roger N. Shepard
1996	Paul A. Samuelson
1997	William K. Estes
1998	William Julius Wilson
1999	Robert M. Solow
2000	Gary S. Becker
2003   R. Duncan Luce
2004   Kenneth J. Arrow
2005   Gordon H. Bower
2008   Michael I. Posner
2009   Mortimer Mishkin
2011   Anne Treisman
2012   Robert Axelrod
2014   Albert Bandura

Biological Sciences
1963	Cornelius Van Niel
1964   Theodosius Dobzhansky, Marshall W. Nirenberg
1965	Francis Peyton Rous, George G. Simpson, Donald D. Van Slyke
1966	Edward F. Knipling, Fritz Albert Lipmann, William C. Rose, Sewall Wright
1967	Kenneth S. Cole, Harry F. Harlow, Michael Heidelberger, Alfred Sturtevant
1968	Horace Barker, Bernard B. Brodie, Detlev W. Bronk, Jay Lush, Burrhus Frederic Skinner
1969 	Robert J. Huebner, Ernst Mayr
1970	Barbara McClintock, Albert Sabin
1973	Daniel I. Arnon, Earl W. Sutherland, Jr.
1974	Britton Chance, Erwin Chargaff, James V. Neel, James Augustine Shannon
1975	Hallowell Davis, Paul Gyorgy, Sterling B. Hendricks, Orville Vogel
1976	Roger C.L. Guillemin, Keith Roberts Porter, Efraim Racker, Edward O. Wilson
1979	Robert H. Burris, Elizabeth C. Crosby, Arthur Kornberg, Severo Ochoa, Earl Reece Stadtman, G. Ledyard Stebbins, Paul A. Weiss
1981	 Philip Handler
1982	 Seymour Benzer, Glenn W. Burton, Mildred Cohn
1983	 Howard Bachrach, Paul Berg, Wendell L. Roelofs, Berta Scharrer
1986	 Stanley Cohen, Donald Henderson, Vernon Mountcastle, George Emil Palade, Joan A. Steitz
1987	 Michael E. Debakey, Theodor O. Diener, Harry Eagle, Har Gobind Khorana, Rita Levi-Montalcini
1988	 Michael S. Brown, Stanley N. Cohen, Joseph L. Goldstein, Maurice Hilleman, Eric R. Kandel, Rosalyn S. Yalow
1989	 Katherine Esau, Viktor Hamburger, Philip Leder, Joshua Lederberg, Roger W. Sperry, Harland G. Wood
1990	 Baruj Benacerraf, Herbert W. Boyer, Daniel E. Koshland, Jr., Edward B. Lewis, David G. Nathan, E. Donnall Thomas
1991	 Mary Ellen Avery, G. Evelyn Hutchinson, Elvin A. Kabat, Robert W. Kates, Salvador E. Luria, Paul A. Marks, Folke K Skoog, Paul C. Zamecnik
1992	 Maxine Singer, Howard M. Temin
1993	 Daniel Nathans, Salome G. Waelsch
1994	 Thomas Eisner, Elizabeth F. Neufeld
1995 	 Alexander Rich
1996	 Ruth Patrick
1997	 James D. Watson, Robert A. Weinberg
1998	 Bruce Ames, Janet Rowley
1999	 David Baltimore, Jared Diamond, Lynn Margulis
2000	 Nancy C. Andreasen, Peter H. Raven, Carl Woese
2001 	 Francisco J. Ayala, George F. Bass, Mario R. Capecchi, Ann Graybiel, Gene E. Likens, Victor A. McKusick, Harold Varmus
2002	 James E. Darnell, Evelyn M. Witkin
2003    J. Michael Bishop, Solomon H. Snyder, Charles Yanofsky
2004    Norman E. Borlaug, Phillip A. Sharp, Thomas Starzl
2005    Anthony Fauci, Torsten N. Wiesel
2006    Rita R. Colwell, Nina Fedoroff, Lubert Stryer
2007    Robert J. Lefkowitz, Bert W. O'Malley
2008    Francis S. Collins, Elaine Fuchs, Craig Venter
2009    Susan L. Lindquist, Stanley B. Prusiner
2010    Ralph L. Brinster, Rudolf Jaenisch
2011    Lucy Shapiro, Leroy Hood, Sallie Chisholm  
2012    May Berenbaum, Bruce Alberts
2013    Rakesh K. Jain
2014    Stanley Falkow, Mary-Claire King, Simon Levin

Chemistry
1964     Roger Adams
1982	  F. Albert Cotton, Gilbert Stork
1983	  Roald Hoffmann, George C. Pimentel, Richard N. Zare
1986	  Harry Gray, Yuan Tseh Lee, Carl S. Marvel, Frank H. Westheimer
1987	  William Summer Johnson, Walter H. Stockmayer, Max Tishler
1988	  William O. Baker, Konrad E. Bloch, Elias J. Corey
1989	  Richard B. Bernstein, Melvin Calvin, Rudolph Marcus, Harden M. McConnell
1990	  Elkan Blout, Karl Folkers, John D. Roberts
1991	  Ronald Breslow, Gertrude B. Elion, Dudley R. Herschbach, Glenn T. Seaborg
1992	  Howard E. Simmons, Jr.
1993	  Donald J. Cram, Norman Hackerman
1994	  George S. Hammond
1995	  Thomas Cech, Isabella L. Karle
1996	  Norman Davidson
1997	  Darleane C. Hoffman, Harold S. Johnston
1998	  John W. Cahn, George M. Whitesides
1999 	  Stuart A. Rice, John Ross, Susan Solomon
2000	  John D. Baldeschwieler, Ralph F. Hirschmann
2001  	  Ernest R. Davidson, Gabor A. Somorjai
2002	  John I. Brauman
2004     Stephen J. Lippard
2005     Tobin J. Marks
2006     Marvin H. Caruthers, Peter Dervan
2007     Mostafa El-Sayed
2008     Joanna S. Fowler, JoAnne Stubbe
2009     Stephen J. Benkovic, Marye Anne Fox
2010     Jacqueline K. Barton, Peter J. Stang
2011     Allen J. Bard, M. Frederick Hawthorne
2012     Judith P. Klinman, Jerrold Meinwald 
2013     Geraldine Richmond 
2014     A. Paul Alivisatos

Engineering Sciences
1962	 Theodore von Kármán
1963	 Vannevar Bush, John Robinson Pierce
1964    Othmar H. Ammann, Charles S. Draper
1965 	 Hugh L. Dryden, Clarence L. Johnson, Warren K. Lewis
1966	 Claude E. Shannon
1967	 Edwin H. Land, Igor I. Sikorsky
1968	 J. Presper Eckert, Nathan M. Newmark
1969	 Jack St. Clair Kilby
1970 	 George E. Mueller
1973	 Harold E. Edgerton, Richard T. Whitcomb
1974	 Rudolf Kompfner, Ralph Brazelton Peck, Abel Wolman
1975	 Manson Benedict, William Hayward Pickering, Frederick E. Terman, Wernher Von Braun
1976 	 Morris Cohen, Peter C. Goldmark, Erwin Wilhelm Müller
1979    Emmett N. Leith, Raymond D. Mindlin, Robert N. Noyce, Earl R. Parker, Simon Ramo
1982	 Edward H. Heinemann, Donald L. Katz
1983	 William R. Hewlett, George M. Low, John G. Trump
1986  	 Hans Wolfgang Liepmann, T. Y. Lin, Bernard M. Oliver
1987 	 Robert B. Bird, H. Bolton Seed, Ernst Weber
1988	 Daniel C. Drucker, Willis M. Hawkins, George W. Housner
1989	 Harry George Drickamer, Herbert E. Grier
1990	 Mildred S. Dresselhaus, Nick Holonyak, Jr.
1991	 George Heilmeier, Luna B. Leopold, H. Guyford Stever
1992	 Calvin F. Quate, John Roy Whinnery
1993	 Alfred Y. Cho
1994	 Ray W. Clough
1995	 Hermann A. Haus
1996	 James L. Flanagan, C. Kumar N. Patel
1998	 Eli Ruckenstein
1999	 Kenneth N. Stevens
2000	 Yuan-Cheng B. Fung
2001	 Andreas Acrivos
2002	 Leo Beranek
2003    John Prausnitz
2004    Edwin N. Lightfoot
2005    Jan D. Achenbach
2006    Robert S. Langer
2007    David Wineland
2008    Rudolf E. Kálmán
2009    Amnon Yariv
2010    Shu Chien
2011    John Goodenough 
2012    Thomas Kailath

Mathematical, Statistical, and Computer Sciences
1963	 Norbert Wiener
1964    Solomon Lefschetz, H. Marston Morse
1965	 Oscar Zariski
1966 	 John Milnor
1967	 Paul Cohen
1968	 Jerzy Neyman
1969	 William Feller
1970    Richard Brauer
1973	 John Tukey
1974 	 Kurt Gödel
1975	 John W. Backus, Shiing-Shen Chern, George B. Dantzig
1976	 Kurt Otto Friedrichs, Hassler Whitney
1979	 Joseph L. Doob, Donald E. Knuth
1982 	 Marshall Harvey Stone
1983	 Herman Goldstine, Isadore Singer
1986	 Peter Lax, Antoni Zygmund
1987	 Raoul Bott, Michael Freedman
1988  	 Ralph E. Gomory, Joseph B. Keller
1989  	 Samuel Karlin, Saunders Mac Lane, Donald C. Spencer
1990	 George F. Carrier, Stephen Cole Kleene, John McCarthy
1991	 Alberto Calderón
1992	 Allen Newell
1993	 Martin Kruskal
1994	 John Cocke
1995	 Louis Nirenberg
1996	 Richard M. Karp, Stephen Smale
1997	 Shing-Tung Yau
1998	 Cathleen Synge Morawetz
1999	 Felix Browder, Ronald R. Coifman
2000	 John Griggs Thompson, Karen K. Uhlenbeck
2001 	 Calyampudi R. Rao, Elias M. Stein
2002	 James G. Glimm
2003    Carl R. de Boor
2004    Dennis P. Sullivan
2005    Bradley Efron
2006    Hyman Bass
2007    Leonard Kleinrock, Andrew J. Viterbi
2009    David B. Mumford
2010    Richard A. Tapia, Srinivasa S.R. Varadhan
2011    Solomon Golomb, Barry Mazur
2012    Alexandre Chorin, posthumous David Blackwell 
2013    Michael Artin

Physical Sciences
1963	Luis W. Alvarez
1964	Julian Schwinger, Harold Clayton Urey, Robert Burns Woodward
1965 	John Bardeen, Peter Debye, Leon M. Lederman, William Rubey
1966	Jacob Bjerknes, Subrahmanyan Chandrasekhar, Henry Eyring, John H. Van Vleck, Vladimir K. Zworykin
1967	Jesse Beams, Francis Birch, Gregory Breit, Louis Hammett, George Kistiakowsky
1968   Paul Doughty Bartlett, Herbert Friedman, Lars Onsager, Eugene Wigner
1969 	Herbert C. Brown, Wolfgang Panofsky
1970	Robert H. Dicke, Allan R. Sandage, John C. Slater, John A. Wheeler, Saul Winstein
1973	Carl Djerassi, Maurice Ewing, Arie Jan Haagen-Smit, Vladimir Haensel, Frederick Seitz, Robert Rathbun Wilson
1974	Nicolaas Bloembergen, Paul Flory, William Alfred Fowler, Linus Carl Pauling, Kenneth Sanborn Pitzer
1975	Hans A. Bethe, Joseph O. Hirschfelder, Lewis Sarett, E. Bright Wilson, Chien-Shiung Wu
1976	Samuel Goudsmit, Herbert S. Gutowsky, Frederick Rossini, Verner Suomi, Henry Taube, George Uhlenbeck
1979	Richard P. Feynman, Herman Mark, Edward M. Purcell, John Sinfelt, Lyman Spitzer, Victor F. Weisskopf
1982 	Philip W. Anderson, Yoichiro Nambu, Edward Teller, Charles H. Townes
1983	E. Margaret Burbidge, Maurice Goldhaber, Helmut Landsberg, Walter Munk, Frederick Reines, Bruno B. Rossi, J. Robert Schrieffer
1986	Solomon J. Buchsbaum, Horace R. Crane, Herman Feshbach, Robert Hofstadter, Chen Ning Yang
1987	Philip Abelson, Walter Elsasser, Paul C. Lauterbur, George Pake, James A. Van Allen
1988	D. Allan Bromley, Paul (Ching-Wu) Chu, Walter Kohn, Norman F. Ramsey, Jack Steinberger
1989 	Arnold O. Beckman, Eugene Parker, Robert P. Sharp, Henry Stommel
1990	Allan M. Cormack, Edwin M. McMillan, Robert Pound, Roger Revelle
1991	Arthur L. Schawlow, Ed Stone, Steven Weinberg
1992	Eugene M. Shoemaker
1993	Val Fitch, Vera Rubin	
1994	Albert Overhauser, Frank Press
1995	Hans Dehmelt, Peter Goldreich
1996	Wallace S. Broecker
1997	Marshall Rosenbluth, Martin Schwarzschild, George Wetherill
1998	Don L. Anderson, John N. Bahcall
1999	James Cronin, Leo Kadanoff
2000	Willis E. Lamb, Jeremiah P. Ostriker, Gilbert F. White
2001	Marvin L. Cohen, Raymond Davis Jr., Charles Keeling
2002	Richard Garwin, W. Jason Morgan, Edward Witten
2003   G. Brent Dalrymple, Riccardo Giacconi
2004   Robert N. Clayton
2005   Ralph A. Alpher, Lonnie Thompson
2006   Daniel Kleppner
2007   Fay Ajzenberg-Selove, Charles P. Slichter
2008   Berni Alder, James E. Gunn
2009   Yakir Aharonov, Esther M. Conwell, Warren M. Washington
2011   Sidney Drell, Sandra Faber, Sylvester James Gates 
2012   Burton Richter, Sean C. Solomon 
2014   Shirley Ann Jackson

References

Citations

Sources 
 National Medal of Science - Recipient Search
 National Medal of Science (1962-2014) - List of all recipients, by alphabetical order
 National Medal of Science (1962-2014) - List of all recipients, in chronological order
 National Medals 2014
 National Medals 2015
 National Medals 2016

National Medal of Science